The 2016 Canoe Marathon European Championships is the thirteenth edition of the Canoe Marathon European Championships, which took place between 30 June and 3 July 2016 at Pontevedra, Spain. The competition consisted of seventeen events – ten in kayak and seven in canoe – divided into junior, under–23 and senior categories.

Medalists

Seniors

Under 23

Juniors

Medal table

References

External links
 

Canoe Marathon European Championships
Canoe Marathon European Championships
International sports competitions hosted by Spain
Marathon European Championships
Canoeing in Spain
June 2016 sports events in Europe
July 2016 sports events in Europe